Sharman Apt Russell (born July 23, 1954) is a nature and science writer based in New Mexico, United States. Her topics include citizen science, living in place, public lands grazing, archaeology, flowers, butterflies, hunger, and Pantheism.

Biography
Russell was born Sharman Apt at Edwards Air Force Base in the Mojave Desert in 1954, was raised in Phoenix, Arizona, and settled in southern New Mexico in 1981. She is married to Peter Russell and has two children. She is the daughter of test pilot Milburn G. Apt, who was killed while testing the Bell X-2 in 1956.

Russell is a professor emerita in the Humanities Department at Western New Mexico University in Silver City, where she teaches writing for graduate students. Russell received her MFA in creative writing from the University of Montana and her B.S. in conservation and natural resources from the University of California, Berkeley.

Works
Russell's essays and short stories have been widely published and anthologized. Her collections of essays Songs of the Fluteplayer: Seasons of Life in the Southwest (Addison-Wesley, 1991; reprinted by University of Nebraska Press, 2000) won the 1992 Mountains and Plains Booksellers Award and New Mexico Zia Award and recounts her years as a back-to-the-lander in rural New Mexico. Standing in the Light: My Life as a Pantheist was a New Mexico Book Award finalist and one of Booklist's top ten religious books of 2008. Her book Diary of a Citizen Scientist: Chasing Tiger Beetles and Other New Ways of Engaging the World (Oregon State University Press, 2014) won the 2016 John Burroughs Medal for Distinguished Nature Writing, the 2015 WILLA Award for Creative Nonfiction, Diary of a Citizen Scientist: Chasing Tiger Beetles and Other New Ways of Engaging the World, and a 2015 New Mexico/Arizona Finalist Award, for Teresa of the New World. Diary of a Citizen Scientist was also listed by The Guardian as one of ten top nature books of 2014. Her historical fantasy Teresa of the New World (Yucca Publishing) for ages 12 and up was released in March 2015, and won the Arizona Authors Award for Fiction. Her eco-science-fiction Knocking on Heaven's Door (Yucca Publishing) came out in 2016 and won the New Mexico/Arizona Book Award for Science Fiction and the Arizona Author's Award for Fiction.

Hunger: An Unnatural History (Basic Books, 2005) was the result of a Rockefeller Fellowship at Bellagio, Italy, and An Obsession with Butterflies: Our Long Love Affair with a Singular Insect (Perseus Books, 2003) was a pick of independent booksellers in the Summer 2003 Book Sense 76. Anatomy of a Rose: Exploring the Secret Life of Flowers has been translated into Korean, Chinese, Swedish, German, Spanish, and Portuguese, with other books also translated into Russian and Italian. Other awards for Russell are a Pushcart Prize, the Henry Joseph Jackson Award, and the Writers at Work Award. The Last Matriarch (University of New Mexico Press, 2000) is a novel about Paleolithic life in New Mexico some 11,000 years ago. The Humpbacked Fluteplayer (Knopf Books for Young Readers, 1994) is a fantasy for ages 8–12.

In 2021, Russell returned to the subject of hunger and malnutrition with a book titled, Within Our Grasp: Childhood Malnutrition Worldwide and the Revolution Taking Place to End It.

References

External links
 

1954 births
Living people
American science writers
American spiritual writers
American Quakers
Converts to Quakerism
Nontheist Quakers
Pantheists
People from Kern County, California
Religious naturalists
Western New Mexico University faculty
Writers from California